Son of Drum Suite is an album by Al Cohn and His Orchestra recorded in 1960 for the RCA Victor label. The album is a sequel to Manny Albam and Ernie Wilkins, The Drum Suite (RCA Victor, 1956).

Reception 

The Allmusic review by Scott Yanow stated "The music on this LP (long overdue to be reissued on CD) holds one's interest throughout, with Al Cohn's writing being particularly inventive".

Track listing 
All compositions by Al Cohn.
 "First Movement: Son of a Drum" – 4:25
 "Second Movement: Brushmanship" – 5:03
 "Third Movement: Dr. Skin and Mr. Hide" – 3:55
 "Fourth Movement: Five Drums in Four-Four Time" – 5:19
 "Fifth Movement: Drums Loco" – 4:54
 "Sixth Movement: Drum Smoke" – 5:42

Personnel 
Al Cohn – conductor
Bernie Glow, Jimmy Maxwell, Clark Terry, Nick Travis – trumpet
Urbie Green, Dick Hixson, Frank Rehak – trombone
Bob Brookmeyer – valve trombone
John Barrows, Jim Buffington – French horn
Ed Caine, Gene Quill – alto saxophone
Romeo Penque, Zoot Sims – tenor saxophone
Sol Schlinger – baritone saxophone
Hank Jones – piano
Mundell Lowe – guitar
Buddy Clark, George Duvivier – bass
Jimmy Cobb, Louis Hayes (tracks 1–3), Gus Johnson (tracks 4–6), Don Lamond, Mel Lewis, Charlie Persip – drums

References 

1960 albums
Al Cohn albums
RCA Records albums